Albert Jesse Bowley Sr. (November 24, 1875 – May 23, 1945) was a Lieutenant General in the United States Army. He was the son of First Lieutenant Freeman S. Bowley, who served in the Civil War with the 30th United States Colored Infantry.

Early career

Bowley was born on November 24, 1875, in Westminster, California, the son of Freeman Sparks Bowley and Flora Ella Pepper Bowley. His sister was actress Flora Juliet Bowley. He graduated from the United States Military Academy in 1897 and was commissioned as a second lieutenant of Artillery. He served in the Philippines during the Spanish–American War.

Between the Spanish–American War and World War I, Bowley served in a variety of command and staff assignments, including commander of a coast artillery company at Fort Greble, Rhode Island, aide-de-camp to Major General Frederick Dent Grant and military attaché in China. He also served on the Mexican border during the Punitive Expedition in pursuit of Pancho Villa of 1916 to 1917.

During World War I, Bowley successively commanded the 17th Field Artillery Regiment, 2nd Field Artillery Brigade, and VI Corps Artillery, additionally attaining the rank of brigadier general in June 1918, and receiving the Army Distinguished Service Medal, The citation for which reads:

Post World War I
In 1921, Bowley became commander of Fort Bragg, North Carolina, a post he held until 1928. During this assignment, he was responsible for Fort Bragg's expansion into one of the Army's largest installations.

Bowley was assigned as temporary commander of VIII Corps 1928, and he commanded the 2nd Infantry Division from 1928 to 1929. From 1929 to 1931 he was the Army's Assistant Army Chief of Staff for Personnel, G-1. In 1931, he was promoted to major general and was assigned to command the US Army's Hawaiian Division, where he remained until 1934. Bowley commanded the Fifth Corps Area from 1934 to 1935, and the Third Corps Area from 1935 to 1938. He was then commander of Fourth Army and Ninth Corps Area. He was promoted to lieutenant general on August 5, 1939, when the four Army commanders were temporarily promoted to the reestablished grade and title of lieutenant general, and served until he reached the mandatory retirement age of 64 on November 24 of the same year.

Death and legacy
General Bowley died at his summer home in Northumberland County, Virginia, on May 22, 1945, and was interred in Section 3 Grave Site 1997-A of Arlington National Cemetery.

He was a hereditary companion of the California Commandery of the Military Order of the Loyal Legion of the United States by right of inheritance from his father was a veteran companion of the Order.

Awards
Below is Lieutenant General Bowley's ribbon bar:

Dates of rank

References

Bibliography

 Biographical Register of the Officers and Graduates of the U.S. Military Academy, by George Washington Cullum, Volume V, 1910 
 The Chicago Blue Book of Selected Names of Chicago and Suburban Towns, published by The Chicago Directory Company, 1909, page 103

 Commendations of Second Division, American Expeditionary Forces, published by Second Division Association, 1919
 U.S. Army Recruiting News, U.S. Army Adjutant General's Office, 1931
 The Chicago Daily News Almanac and Year Book for 1937, published by Chicago Daily News, 1937, page 214
 U.S. Army Directory, U.S. Army Adjutant General's Office, 1939
 "Gen. A.J. Bowley Dead In Virginia," New York Times, May 24, 1945, http://select.nytimes.com/gst/abstract.html?res=F20E15FD3E5F1B7B93C6AB178ED85F418485F9
 U.S. Air Force General Officer Biographies, Albert J. Bowley Jr., https://web.archive.org/web/20090910215827/http://www.af.mil/information/bios/bio_print.asp?bioID=4752&page=1

1875 births
1945 deaths
United States Army Field Artillery Branch personnel
Military personnel from California
People from Westminster, California
United States Army generals
United States Military Academy alumni
American military personnel of the Spanish–American War
Recipients of the Distinguished Service Medal (US Army)
Officiers of the Légion d'honneur
Recipients of the Croix de Guerre 1914–1918 (France)
Burials at Arlington National Cemetery
United States Army generals of World War I